The seal of the House of Representatives of the Philippines is the seal officially adopted by the House of Representatives of the Philippines to authenticate certain official documents. The seal is of the Office of the House of Representatives and not to any members of the House including the speaker of the House.

Description
The Seal of the Philippine House of Representatives was adopted through House Resolution No. 233 on September 23, 2015. The seal consists of the Coat of Arms of the Philippines without the scroll and inscription in the center. 81 stars are encircled around the coat of arms representing the 81 provinces of the Philippines. The year "1907" is inscribed at the bottom of the coat of arms, representing the year the first Philippine Assembly was inaugurated. Before 2015, the year indicated on the seal was "1987", the year that the current form of the House of Representatives was established after the adaption of the 1987 constitution.

Evolution of the House seal

References

House of Representatives of the Philippines
Philippine House of Representatives